Monday Night Football is a live American television broadcast of the National Football League, which aired on ABC 1970–2006, and has aired on ESPN since 2006.

The title Monday Night Football may also refer to:
ABC Monday Night Football (video game), based on the National Football League program
Monday Night Football (British TV programme), a British live television broadcast of association football by Sky Sports (1992–2007, 2010–present)
"Monday Night Football" (How I Met Your Mother), the 14th episode in the second season of the television series How I Met Your Mother (2007)
Monday Night Football on Triple M, an Australian NRL Rugby League radio program that has been broadcast since 2007
Monday Night Soccer, a League of Ireland football highlights show broadcast on RTÉ Two since 2008